Maika Ozaki (born 25 October 1984) is a Japanese former professional tennis player.

Born in Hokkaido, Ozaki reached a best singles world ranking of 320. She won one title on the ITF Women's Circuit and featured in the main draw of the 2003 Japan Open, losing in the first round to Ashley Harkleroad.

ITF finals

Singles: 4 (1–3)

References

External links
 
 

1984 births
Living people
Japanese female tennis players
Sportspeople from Hokkaido
20th-century Japanese women
21st-century Japanese women